This was the first edition of the event.

Guido Pella won the title defeating Facundo Argüello in the final, 6–1, 6–0.

Seeds

Draw

Finals

Top half

Bottom half

References
 Main Draw
 Qualifying Draw

IS Open - Singles
2013 Singles